is a Japanese professional golfer.

Suzuki won 16 tournaments on the Japan Golf Tour and (as of March 2023) ranks 15th on the career victories list.

Professional wins (19)

Japan Golf Tour wins (16)

Japan Golf Tour playoff record (3–0)

Other wins (3)
1975 Kuzuha International
1976 Aso National Park Open
1984 Kuzuha International

Results in major championships

Note: Suzuki only played in the Masters Tournament and The Open Championship.

"T" indicates a tie for a place

Team appearances
World Cup (representing Japan): 1978, 1980

See also
List of golfers with most Japan Golf Tour wins

References

External links

Japanese male golfers
Japan Golf Tour golfers
Sportspeople from Kagawa Prefecture
1951 births
Living people